The Pauli Gerrei trilingual inscription is a trilingual Greek-Latin-Phoenician inscription on the base of a bronze column found in San Nicolò Gerrei in Sardinia in 1861. The stele was discovered by a notary named Michele Cappai, on the right side of the  Strada statale 387 del Gerrei that descends towards Ballao.

Spano donated the inscription to the Museum of Turin; Turin had been the first capital of the unified Kingdom of Italy from 1861 to 1865. Spano subsequently obtained the nomination as Senator of the Kingdom. It is currently in the Turin Archaeology Museum. On 10 October 2009 the then mayor Silvestro Furcas requested the inscription be returned to Pauli Gerrei.

It is also known as KAI 66 and CIS I 143.

Inscriptions
The inscriptions are a votive gift to the Sardinian healing deity, equivalent to the Phoenician Eshmun and the Roman Asclepius in gratitude for a grace received. 

The three texts do not correspond perfectly to each other. It is thought that the dedications were addressed to different social groups. The Latin text states that Cleon claims is a "slave (S.) of the contracting partners  of the salt pans"; the fact that he does not indicate the name of his father and of the tribe he belongs to is an indication of his social status as a servant. The Punic text does not label Cleon as a slave but instead as an employee of the saltworks concession. The Greek inscription described Cleon's role as "superintendent of the salt pans".
 Latin: 
 Translation: Cleon, a salari(ed) s(lave) of (the) comp(any), dedicated (this altar) as a gift to Asclepius-Merre, to whom thanks is deserving.
 Greek: 
 Translation: For Asclepius-Merre this altar was erected, by salt-man Kleon, as (he was) commanded.
 Punic (transcribed): L’DN L’ŠMN M’RḤ M-ZBḤ NḤŠT MŠQL LṬRM M’T Y. ’Š NDR ’KLYN Š’SGM ’Š B MMLHT. ŠM[῾] [Q]L’ RPY’. BŠT ŠPṬM ḤMLKT W῾BD’ŠMN BN ḤMLN.
 Translation: To Lord Eshmun-Merre(ḥ), a bronze altar with a weight of 100, which was dedicated by Kleon, (employee) of the agents who (work) in the saltworks: He heard his voice, He healed (him). In the year of the suffetes Himilco and 'Abd-Eshmun, son of Himilk.

Bibliography
 Pietro Martini, Iscrizione trilingue in bronzo, Bullettino Archeologico Sardo 7 (1861), pp. 57-59; 
 
 Pietro Martini and Gaspare Gorresio, Sopra la base di bronzo con iscrizione trilingue, Bullettino Archeologico Sardo 8 (1862), pp. 24-29
 Spano, R. Accademia delle Scienze di Torino, Memorie, ser. II, (20) (1863), pp. 87-114; 
 Spano, Bullettino Archeologico Sardo 9 (1863) pp. 89-95; 
 Spano, Scoperte archeologiche fattesi nell’isola (estratti da Rivista Sarda) 1865, p. 20, 36; 
 Fabrizio Pennacchietti, Un termine latino nell’iscrizione punica CIS n° 143? Una nuova congettura in: Beccari & Marello, La parola al testo, 2001, pp. 302-315
 Ritschl, F., & Gildemeister, J. (1865). Dreisprachige Inschrift von Sardinien. Rheinisches Museum Für Philologie, 20, 1-14
 Levy, Moritz Abraham,  m Ueber eine lateinisch-griechisch-phönizische Inschrift aus Sardinien, Zeitschrift der Deutschen Morgenländischen Gesellschaft : ZDMG / Deutsche Morgenländische Gesellschaft
 Moriggi, M. (2011). PHOENICIAN AND PUNIC INSCRIPTIONS IN THE MUSEO DI ANTICHITÀ DI TORINO (TURIN, ITALY), Egitto E Vicino Oriente, 34, 81-94
 
 Plurilinguismo e motivazioni identitarie nel Mediterraneo del II/I sec. a.C. Il caso della trilingue di Pauli Gerrei, in [Incontri linguistici : 41, 2018][Pisa : Fabrizio Serra, 2018.] - Permalink: http://digital.casalini.it/10.19272/201800801005 - Permalink: http://digital.casalini.it/4460957

Notes

1861 archaeological discoveries
Multilingual texts
Phoenician inscriptions
Archaeological artifacts
KAI inscriptions
Phoenician steles